Chocolate City: Vegas Strip is a 2017 American comedy-drama film directed and written by filmmaker Jean-Claude La Marre. The film stars Michael Jai White, Robert Ri'chard, Michael Bolwaire, Ginuwine, Mekhi Phifer, Darrin Henson, Mel B and Vivica A. Fox. It is the sequel to the 2015 film Chocolate City.

On August 12, 2017, the film became available on Netflix.

Synopsis
The Chocolate City dancers go to Las Vegas in hopes of winning $500 000 dollars during a prestigious competition. This money would be used to save the nightclub 'Chocolate City' from foreclosure.

Cast

 Michael Jai White as Princeton
 Robert Ri'chard as Michael McCoy
 Michael Bolwaire as Bolo 
 Ginuwine as Pharaoh
 Mekhi Phifer as Best Valentine
 Darrin Henson as Magnus
 Mel B as Brandy
 Vivica A. Fox as Katherine McCoy
 Marc John Jefferies as Carlton Jones
 Imani Hakim as Carmen
 Nikki Leigh as Ms Daisy
 Ernest Thomas as Mr Williams
 Baron Davis as Jacob the Comedian
 Kathleen Robertson as Tess
 K.D. Aubert as Wanda
 Kiersey Clemons as Odessa
 Gabriel Casseus as Tone
 Trae Ireland as Deacon Wade Nixon
 Jean-Claude La Marre as Pastor Jones
 Keith Carlos as Seduktion
 Adele Givens as GrandMaw
 Jaymes Vaughan as Adonis
 Lil Yachty as himself
 Don Lemon as himself

Release
On August 12, 2017, the movie became available on Netflix under the title Chocolate City: Vegas Strip.

References

External links
 
 

2017 comedy-drama films
American comedy-drama films
Films set in Atlanta
Films set in the Las Vegas Valley
Films shot in California
African-American films
Films directed by Jean-Claude La Marre
Films about striptease
Films scored by Lyle Workman